Skokie was a family of research vehicles developed by the Cook Electric Co. for the United States Air Force during the mid to late 1950s. Launched from a B-29 bomber, Skokie 1 was an unpowered, ballistic vehicle, while Skokie 2 was rocket-propelled; both were used for evaluating and testing high-speed parachute recovery systems.

Design and development
Intended for use in evaluating high-speed parachute systems for the recovery of missiles and unmanned aircraft, Skokie was a simple, inexpensively-designed vehicle, consisting of a tube with a long spike on the nose to reduce damage while landing under parachute. Named after the hometown of the Cook Electric Co., their manufacturer, Skokie 1 had four aft-mounted stabilizing fins; Skokie 2 had a tri-fin arrangement, with three solid-propellant rockets, of a type similar to that used for rocket-assisted take offs, externally mounted between them. The vehicle was equipped with instrumentation to record the deployment of the two-stage parachute; a high-speed camera was also fitted. Skokie I descended ballistically at high subsonic speed; the rocket-powered Skokie II could reach Mach 2 before deploying its parachute.

Mission profile
On each drop, the vehicle would deploy an initial parachute to calibrate the onboard equipment, following which it would be released to allow the vehicle to build up speed.

References

Citations

Bibliography

External links
"Peaceful Missile Nose-Dives From B-29 To Test Parachute". Popular Science, June 1954, p.148.

Experimental rockets of the United States
Equipment of the United States Air Force
Boeing B-29 Superfortress